Letní stadion (Czech for Summer stadium) may refer to any of the following football stadiums in the Czech Republic:
 Letní stadion, Chomutov
 Letní stadion, Pardubice
 Fotbalový stadion Josefa Masopusta, formerly known as Letní stadion, in Most